Strange World or Strange Worlds may refer to:

Books
 Strange Worlds (Avon Comics), a 1950-1955 U.S. science fiction anthology comic book series
 Strange Worlds (Atlas Comics), a 1958-1959 U.S. science fiction anthology comic book series
 Strange Worlds (Ralph Milne Farley collection), a 1953 book anthology of science fiction stories by Ralph Milne Farley
 Strange World, a 1964 book by Frank Edwards

Film and TV
 Strange World (TV series) a 1999 U.S. TV show
 Strange World (film), a 2022 Disney animated film

Music
 Strange World (soundtrack), the soundtrack album to the 2022 Disney film
 Strange World, a 2022 EP by Ha Sung-woon
 "Strange World" (song), a 1995 song by Ké
 "Strange World", a 1980 song by Iron Maiden from their debut album Iron Maiden
 "Strange World", a 2000 single by Mike Dierickx, recording as Push
 "Strange World", a 2003 electronica song by The Eternals from their debut album Astropioneers
 "Strange World", a 2005 song by Gamma Ray from their album Majestic
 "Strange World", a 2012 song by the Beach Boys from their album That's Why God Made the Radio

See also

 Strange New World (disambiguation)

 Strange Free World, 1991 album by Kitchens of Distinction
 World Gone Strange, 1991 album by Andy Summers
 Strange Is This World, 1972 album by Niemen